The Shire of Laverton is a local government area in the Goldfields-Esperance region of Western Australia, about  northeast of the city of Kalgoorlie and about  east-northeast of the state capital, Perth.

History

The Mount Margaret Road District was gazetted on 17 August 1906. It absorbed the Municipality of Mount Morgans on 28 February 1913. On 13 November 1925, it absorbed some land from neighbouring road districts, most notably Lawlers.

It was renamed the Laverton Road District on 20 January 1950. It was made a shire on 1 July 1961 following the passage of the  Local Government Act 1960, which reformed all remaining road districts into shires.

The residents of the Shire are represented by 7 Councillors.

Towns and localities
The towns and localities of the Shire of Laverton with population and size figures based on the most recent Australian census:

Ghost towns
Ghost towns of the Shire of Laverton:
 Beria
 Burtville
 Duketon
 Euro
 Mount Margaret
 Mount Morgans

Heritage-listed places

As of 2023, 38 places are heritage-listed in the Shire of Laverton, of which two are on the State Register of Heritage Places, the former Hotel Australia and the Mt Margaret Mission Hospital ruin.

References

External links
 

Laverton